Dato' Mizal Zaini, known professionally as AC Mizal (born 21 December 1971), is a Malaysian actor, singer, comedian, TV host and former radio presenter.

Early life 
Mizal was born on 21 December 1971 in Johor Bahru, Johor. He is the son of Datuk Zaini Md. Hasim and Datin Madzinah Mansor. He holds an Sijil Pelajaran Malaysia (SPM), and later he pursued his higher education at the Royal Military College of Malaysia.

Career 
AC Mizal started his career as a singer, wherein he was one of the members of a Malaysian hip hop group, 4U2C, which enjoyed musical supremacy between 1992 and 1996 during the rise of Malaysian hip hop music. The group best known for its hit single, "Fiona" which become their signature songs. AC has produced three albums with the group. 4U2C disbanded in 1996 and most of its members decided to pursue their studies and concentrated on their respective careers. AC himself later pursue his acting career after the group went their separate ways.

Under the mentorship from Yusof Haslam, his acting career began as a main cast as CPL Jefri in early incarnation of Roda-Roda Kuala Lumpur, which aired between 1998 and 1999. His breakthrough role came when he portraying Inspector Mazlan in the longest-running Malaysian action drama series, Gerak Khas. He was one of the series' seven original casts which include Abby Abadi, ACP Shaharon Anuar, Yusof Haslam, Farid Amirul and Deen Maidin. Mizal then reprise his role in the series' two movie adaptations. He left the series in 2002 after four seasons, due to personal reasons and other commitments.

Prior to Gerak Khas movie adaptations, Mizal made his film debut with 1999 drama film, Bara as Hisham. The following year, he acted in Pasrah where he paired with Erra Fazira. In 2004, Mizal released his solo album, Tassamaqu with "Kali Pertama" featuring Malaysian rapper Reefa, released as singles.

In the same year, he acted in Afdlin Shauki's 2004 comedy film, Buli, where he plays Rudy, a mastermind behind the fictional Allied Asian Bank robbery. He reprise his role on the film's sequel, Buli Balik which was released in 2006. He also acted alongside Afdlin, Hans Isaac and Awie in Baik Punya Cilok (2005).

He is one of few Malaysian artists who contributed a special song titled "Suluhkan Sinar" ("Shine the Light"). Produced by KRU and released in January 2005, the song was specially dedicated to the victims of the 2004 Indian Ocean earthquake and tsunami and it is officiated by the then-Deputy Prime Minister, Najib Razak. Other artists involved in the project were Akademi Fantasia contestants, Erra Fazira, Dayang Nurfaizah, Alleycats, Jaclyn Victor and Anita Sarawak.

In 2006, Mizal went on to become a TV host and helmed the entertainment talk show AC Di Sini aired on Astro Ria. He also appear with Adlin Aman Ramlie as the Ginger Brothers in two Cicakman film series. The following year, he released his single, "Di Sini". From 2008 to 2009, he became the host of reality talent show, Akademi Fantasia, succeeding Aznil Nawawi. Mizal also judged comedy talent shows such as Raja Lawak, Maharaja Lawak and Maharaja Lawak Mega. He also ventured into theatre in Puteri Gunung Ledang The Musical in 2005 and 2009, and Cuci The Musical in 2009.

He also runs his direct-selling company AC Konsortium Sdn Bhd where he served as the Executive Chairman; the company produces magnet rings and other products. It has been reported that Mizal will make his return in Gerak Khas after a long absence, but it did not materialised. From 2013 to 2015, he served as the host of talk show Sembang Teh Tarik which aired on Astro Warna and in 2016, he hosted the series' revival, Sembang Teh Tarik Kaw.

In 2014, Mizal reformed 4U2C after went on 18-year hiatus with the group renamed as ForUToC, with all new members. He later released his single, "Paranoid" featuring Indonesian actress, Luna Maya. He started an internet radio station, Peace Yall FM in May 2015 and officiated by singer Siti Nurhaliza, wherein Mizal also served as its President. In 2017, he played a dual role as King Kong and Cobra in highest-grossing box office action comedy film, Abang Long Fadil 2 directed by Syafiq Yusof, also starring Zizan Razak in main role. It was his first movie role in 8 years since Afdlin Shauki's My Spy (2009). He also contributed its soundtrack titled "Senorita" with Syamsul Yusof and Shuib Sepahtu.

In 2018, he hosted Super Spontan Xtravaganza, Arena Panggang season 2 and Maharaja Lawak Mega 2018. The following year, Mizal appeared as Jefri Dom in television series, Pop Yeah Yeah.

Personal life 
AC Mizal has been married twice. He married Shafnie Zainuddin on 24 June 1995, and they had two sons, Muhammad Shafiq Iman and Muhammad Shabale Iman. The couple divorced on 17 October 2001. On 10 October 2002, he married former model and actress Emylia Rosnaida, with whom he has two children, a son, Muhammad Reeve Damien, and a daughter, Fea Eryssa.

His father, Zaini Md. Hashim, who was a Muar Police Chief, died on 29 March 2014.

Discography

Studio albums

Singles

Filmography

Film

Television series

Telemovie

Television

Honours

Honours of Malaysia 
  :
  Knight Companion of the Order of the Crown of Pahang (DIMP) – Dato' (2010)

He was awarded Darjah Indera Mahkota Pahang (DIMP) which carries the title of Dato' from Sultan Ahmad Shah, Sultan of Pahang at the end of 2010.

References

External links 

 
 
 

1971 births
Living people
People from Johor Bahru
Malaysian people of Malay descent
Malaysian Muslims
Malaysian television personalities
Malaysian male actors
21st-century Malaysian male singers
Malaysian comedians
20th-century Malaysian male singers